The following is a list of NBA versus EuroLeague games. The list includes only games in which NBA clubs have played against teams that participated in that same upcoming season's top-tier level EuroLeague competition. The first game was played in the year 1978, by the defending NBA champion, the Washington Bullets, and Maccabi Tel Aviv, prior to the 1978–79 basketball season.

Rules
FIBA era (1978–1999):
The games between NBA and FIBA EuroLeague teams, that took place between 1978 and 1999, were played under a set of mixed FIBA and NBA rules.
Euroleague Basketball era (2003–present):
The games that take place in the United States and Canada, are played under NBA rules, and with three NBA refs. The games that take place outside of the United States and Canada, are played under NBA rules, with two NBA refs and one EuroLeague ref.

Statistical records of NBA teams against EuroLeague teams

Records by game rules
FIBA era (1978–1999):
NBA teams had a record of 23–3 against FIBA EuroLeague teams, during the FIBA era, when the games were played under a set of mixed NBA and FIBA rules.
Euroleague Basketball era (2003–present):
NBA teams have a combined record of 52–13 against EuroLeague teams, since 2003, playing under NBA rules.
NBA teams have a record of 36–4, when playing the games at home, under NBA rules, and with three NBA refs.
NBA teams have a record of 16–9, when playing the games away, under NBA rules, with two NBA refs and one EuroLeague ref.
NBA teams have an overall record of 75–16 against EuroLeague teams.

Records by decade
1970s (mixed rules):
NBA teams had a record of 0–1 against FIBA EuroLeague teams.
1980s (mixed rules): 
NBA teams had a record of 8–2 against FIBA EuroLeague teams.
1990s (NBA rules):
NBA teams had a record of 15–0 against EuroLeague teams.
2000s (NBA rules):
NBA teams had a record of 32–5 against EuroLeague teams.
2010s (NBA rules):
NBA teams have a record of 20–8 against EuroLeague teams.

Game results FIBA era (1978–1999)
This is a list of NBA versus FIBA EuroLeague games, during the FIBA era, when the FIBA EuroLeague was run by FIBA Europe, from the inaugural 1958 FIBA European Champions Cup season, to the 2000–01 FIBA SuproLeague season. The list includes only games in which NBA clubs have played against teams that participated in that same upcoming season's top-tier level FIBA EuroLeague competition. The first game was played in the year 1978, prior to the 1978–79 basketball season. The games between NBA and FIBA EuroLeague teams, that took place between 1978 and 1999, were played under a set of mixed FIBA and NBA rules.

1970s

1980s

1990s

Game results Euroleague Basketball era (2003–present)
This is a list of NBA versus EuroLeague games during the Euroleague Basketball era, since the EuroLeague has been run by Euroleague Basketball, beginning with the Euroleague 2000–01 season. The list includes only games in which NBA clubs have played against teams that participated in that same upcoming season's top-tier level EuroLeague competition. The first games were played in the year 2003, prior to the 2003–04 basketball season. The games that take place in the United States and Canada are played under NBA rules, and with three NBA refs. The games that take place outside of the United States and Canada are played under NBA rules, with two NBA refs and one EuroLeague ref.

2000s

2010s

NBA champions vs EuroLeague champions 
The following is a list of games that have been played between the then current champions of the NBA, and the then current champions of the EuroLeague.

See also
 NBA Global Games
 NBA Canada Series
 List of games played between NBA and international teams
 McDonald's Championship
 EuroLeague American Tour
 Naismith Cup

References

External links
History of Games Played By NBA Teams In Europe
Games Played Between European And NBA clubs

EuroLeague
National Basketball Association lists